Cardelli is an Italian surname. Notable people with the surname include:

 Alessandro Cardelli (born 1991), Sammarinese politician
 Daniele Cardelli (born 1995), Italian football player
 Francesco Cardelli (born 1964), Sammarinese alpine skier
 Luca Cardelli, Italian computer scientist
 Marino Cardelli (born 1987), Sammarinese alpine skier

See also
 Cardella

Italian-language surnames